The 2021 Delhi 2nd Division Qualifiers was a qualification tournament for the 2021 I-League Qualifiers organized by Football Delhi.

The qualification tournament was originally set to begin from May, but it was postponed and kicked off on July 17. The 10 teams were divided into two groups. The top two teams from each group are advancing to the semi-finals. Delhi FC and Garhwal FC were nominated for 2021 I-League Qualifiers.

Teams
A total of 10 teams participates in the league. Teams were divided into groups A and B:

Standings

Group A

Group B

Knockout stage

Bracket

References

Football in Delhi
3
2021–22 in Indian football